The Virgin Presenting Saint Rosalia to the Trinity is an oil on canvas painting, now in the Alte Pinakothek in Munich. Its poor condition makes attribution difficult, but it is usually attributed to Anthony van Dyck in his Sicilian period (1624-1625)

References

1625 paintings
Collection of the Alte Pinakothek
Religious paintings by Anthony van Dyck
Paintings of the Virgin Mary
Paintings depicting Jesus
Paintings of Saint Rosalia